Stuart High School may refer to:

Stuart High School (Nebraska), Stuart, Nebraska
Stuart High School (Oklahoma), Stuart, Oklahoma
Stuart High School (Whyalla), City of Whyalla, South Australia
J. E. B. Stuart High School, Falls Church, Virginia
Stuart Training School, Stuart, Florida
Martin County High School, Stuart, Florida